This is a list of the radio stations in Baja California, which can be sorted by their call signs, frequencies, location, ownership, names, and programming formats. Pirate radio stations have not been included in the list.

Notes

References

Baja California